Taras Zaviyskyi (born 12 April 1995) is a Ukrainian professional footballer who plays as an attacking midfielder for Bruk-Bet Termalica Nieciecza.

Club career

Zaviyskyi is the product of the Karpaty Lviv School System, where he is from age of ten years. His first trainer was Mykola Dudarenko. He made his debut for FC Karpaty entering as a second-half substitute against FC Metalurh Zaporizhya on 15 March 2013 in Ukrainian Premier League.

Karpaty Lviv
In 2012 he started his career with Karpaty Lviv in Ukrainian Premier League. On 29 October 2016 he scored against Dynamo Kyiv at the NSC Olimpiyskiy.

Olimpik Donetsk
In summer 2019 he signed a contract with Olimpik Donetsk in Ukrainian Premier League. On 12 July 2020 he scored two goals against Mariupol on the 1–4 victory.

Desna Chernihiv
On 15 July 2021 he signed a contract for two years with Desna Chernihiv in the Ukrainian Premier League. On 25 July 2021, he made his league debut with the new club against Chornomorets Odesa, scoring a goal in the 3–0 victory. On 14 August 2021 he scored against SC Dnipro-1. On 7 November 2021, he scored against Lviv at the Arena Lviv.

Bruk-Bet Termalica
On 21 June 2022, Zaviyskyi joined Polish I liga side Bruk-Bet Termalica Nieciecza on a two-year deal with an extension option. On 15 July, he made his debut against Odra Opole.

International career
He represented Ukraine at multiple youth levels, including under-16, under-17, under-18 and under-19.

Career statistics

Club

References

External links
 Profile on Official FC Desna Chernihiv website
 
 

1995 births
Living people
Ukrainian footballers
Ukrainian expatriate footballers
Ukraine student international footballers
Ukraine youth international footballers
FC Karpaty Lviv players
FC Lviv players
SV Buchonia Flieden players
FC Olimpik Donetsk players
FC Desna Chernihiv players
Bruk-Bet Termalica Nieciecza players
Ukrainian Premier League players
Ukrainian Second League players
Hessenliga players
Association football midfielders
Ukrainian expatriate sportspeople in Germany
Expatriate footballers in Germany
Ukrainian expatriate sportspeople in Poland
Expatriate footballers in Poland
Sportspeople from Lviv